Pedroche is a Spanish surname. Notable people with the surname include:

Cristina Pedroche (born 1988), Spanish actress, presenter, comedian, television reporter, and model
María Teresa García Pedroche (born 1959), American artist and curator

 Spanish-language surnames